Rodrigo is a Spanish, Portuguese and Italian name derived from the Germanic name Roderick (Gothic *Hroþareiks, via Latinized Rodericus or Rudericus), given specifically in reference to either  King Roderic (d. 712),  the last Visigothic ruler or to Saint Roderick (d. 857), one of the Martyrs of Córdoba (feast day 13 March).
The modern given name has the short forms Ruy, Rui, and in Galician Roi.

The name is very frequently given in Portugal; it was the most popularly given masculine name in 2011–2012, and during 2013–2016 ranked between 4th and 2nd most popular.
It is also moderately popular in Spain, ranking between 30th and 60th most popular during 2002–2015.

History
The form Rodrigo becomes current in the later medieval period. It is recorded in the Cantar de Mio Cid, written c. 1200, as the name of 
Rodrigo Díaz de Vivar (c. 1043–1099, known as   El Cid Campeador).  And Don Rodrigo king of visigoths (688-711), in the Spanish Visigothic Kingdom.

Rodrigo Jiménez de Rada (c. 1170  – 1247) was a Navarrese-born Castilian bishop and historian.
Rodrigo Lanzol Borja (1431–1503) was the birth name of Pope Alexander VI (r. 1492–1503).
Rodrigo de Triana was the name of the Spanish sailor to have first sighted the New World (i.e., the island of Guanahani) on Columbus' first voyage (on 12 October 1492).
Rodrigo López (c. 1525–1594) was a physician to Queen Elizabeth.
Rodrigo de la Guitarra was a medieval Spanish musician

Modern given name
Rodrigo Soares (born 1992), Brazilian footballer known as Rodrigo
Rodrigo Blankenship (born 1997), American football player
Rodrigo Tiuí, Brazilian footballer
Rodrigo (musician)  (1973–2000), Argentine singer
Rodrigo de la Cadena (born 1988), Mexican singer and performing artist
Rodrigo Damm (born 1980), Brazilian mixed martial artist
Rodrigo Duterte (born 1945), Filipino politician and 16th President of the Philippines (2016-2022)
Rodrigo González (Mexican musician) (1950–1985), Mexican musician also known as "Rockdrigo" González
Rodrigo González (swimmer) (born 1968), Mexican freestyle swimmer
Rodrigo Gracie (born 1975), a retired Brazilian mixed martial artist
Rodrigo Beckham (born 1976), Brazilian footballer
Rodrigo Masias (born 1981), Peruvian basketball player
Rodrigo Moreno (athlete) (born 1966), Colombian race walker
Rodrigo Núñez, Chilean footballer
Rodrigo Chagas, Brazilian footballer
Rodrigo Gral, Brazilian footballer
Rodrigo Lindoso, Brazilian footballer
Rodrigo Tosi, Brazilian footballer
Rodrigão (footballer, born 1995), Brazilian footballer
Rodrigo (footballer, born 1897), Brazilian footballer
Rodrigo (footballer, born 1971), Brazilian footballer
Rodrigo (footballer, born 1978), Brazilian footballer
Rodrigo (footballer, born 1979), Brazilian footballer
Rodrigo (footballer, born August 1980), Brazilian footballer
Rodrigo (footballer, born October 1980), Brazilian footballer
Rodrigo (footballer, born 1985), Brazilian footballer
Rodrigo (footballer, born 1987), Brazilian footballer
Rodrigo (footballer, born 1991), Brazilian-born Spanish footballer
Rodrigo (footballer, born 1994), Brazilian footballer
Rodrigo (footballer, born 1999), Brazilian footballer
Rodrigo (beach soccer player), born 1993, Brazilian beach soccer player
Rodrigo Lima (fighter) (born 1991), Brazilian mixed martial artist
Rodrigo Lima (footballer) (born 1999), Cape Verdean footballer
Rodrigo Pesántez Rodas (1937–2020), Ecuadorian poet and writer
Rodrigo Santoro, Brazilian actor
Rodrigo dos Santos, Brazilian water polo player
Rodrigo Augusto da Silva (1833–1889), Brazilian senator that cosigned the Golden law (Lei Aurea)
Rodri (footballer, born 1996), Spanish footballer

Modern surname
América del Pilar Rodrigo, Argentinian botanist who used the standard botanical abbreviation "Rodrigo"
Chandimanthu Rodrigo, Sri Lankan Sinhala cricketer
Dushantha Lakshman Rodrigo (born 1968), Sri Lankan Sinhala Anglican cleric, Anglican Bishop of Colombo
Granville Rodrigo, Sri Lankan Sinhala actor and vocalist
Joaquín Rodrigo, Spanish composer
José Sisto Rodrigo, Commissioner of Guam
Lakshan Rodrigo, Sri Lankan Sinhala cricketer
Lasantha Rodrigo, Sri Lankan cricketer
Mahesh Rodrigo, Sri Lankan Sinhala cricketer and rugby player
Malcolm Rodrigo, Sri Lankan Sinhala cricketer
Manoj Rodrigo, Sri Lankan Sinhala cricketer
Nalin Rodrigo, Sri Lankan Sinhala obstetrician, gynecologist, surgeon, medical teacher and medical administrator
Olivia Rodrigo (2003-2023), American singer and actress
Philip Rodrigo, Sri Lankan Sinhala politician
Sandaruwan Rodrigo, Sri Lankan Sinhala cricketer
Sanjaya Rodrigo, Sri Lankan Sinhala cricketer
Teresa Rodrigo (1956–2020), Spanish scientist spcailizing in particle physics
Thome Rodrigo (c. mid-1500s), Sri Lankan Sinhala Karava noble, signatory of the Convention of Malvana between the Kingdom of Portugal and the Kingdom of Kotte

See also

Rodrigues (disambiguation)
Rodriguez (disambiguation)
Rodriguinho (disambiguation)

References

Spanish masculine given names

cs:Rodrigo
es:Rodrigo (desambiguación)
fr:Rodrigo
ja:ロドリゴ
pl:Rodrigo
pt:Rodrigo (desambiguação)
ru:Родриго
fi:Rodrigo
zh:罗德里戈